Good with Me is the debut studio album by Canadian country music singer Eric Ethridge. It was released on October 30, 2020 through Anthem Entertainment.  It includes the singles "Dream Girl". "Kiss Me Goodbye", and "Sad Songs".

Track listing

Charts

Singles

Release history

References

2020 debut albums
Anthem Records albums